Deep Time is a BBC Books original novel written by Trevor Baxendale and based on the long-running British science fiction television series Doctor Who. It features the Twelfth Doctor and Clara Oswald. The book was released on 10 September 2015 as a part of The Glamour Chronicles, alongside Royal Blood and Big Bang Generation.

Audiobook 

An unabridged audiobook version of Deep Time was released on 5 November 2015. It was read by Dan Starkey who played Strax in the series.

References

External links 
 
 

2015 British novels
2015 science fiction novels
New Series Adventures
Twelfth Doctor novels
Novels by Trevor Baxendale